Nasi liwet is an Indonesian dish rice dish cooked in coconut milk, chicken broth and spices, from Solo, Central Java, Indonesia. Common  steamed rice is usually cooked in water, but nasi liwet is rice cooked in coconut milk, chicken broth, salam leaves and lemongrass, thus giving the rice a rich, aromatic and succulent taste. Nasi liwet is a traditional Javanese way of cooking rice in coconut milk. There is one variant of liwet rice, the style of Nasi Liwet Sunda from West Java  with its unique Sundanese cuisine a different taste and presentation from Sundanese eating tradition called ngeliwet or botram (a dish made with banana leaves and eaten together).

Serving
Nasi liwet is topped with a slice of omelette, shredded chicken that had also been cooked in coconut milk and a spoonful of a thick aromatic coconut cream called kumut. Served alongside nasi liwet is opor ayam (a delicate chicken in a mild white coconut milk based sauce scented with galangal and lime leaves), telur pindang (eggs boiled slowly with spices), tempeh and labu siam (chayote) as the vegetable.

Traditionally, the pan used for cooking was made of clay. The taste and aroma is generally better if it is cooked on a wood fire, but different regions have different ways of preparing it. Traditionally, it is served on a banana leaf or teak leaf. Frequently, people prefer teak leaves to plates, because of the natural fragrance of the leaf. Nasi liwet complements (side dishes) always consist of coconut milk.

Popularity and variants
In Solo, nasi liwet is usually eaten for breakfast, but also a popular choice for lunch or supper. In Keprabon subdistrict, Surakarta, nasi liwet is only served for supper at the nighttime. Similar rice-coconut milk dishes can be found in other parts of Indonesia, such as nasi uduk from Betawi cuisine, nasi gurih from Acehnese cuisine, and nasi lemak from Malay cuisine.

See also

Nasi bogana
Nasi campur
Nasi goreng
Nasi kucing
Nasi kuning
Nasi pecel
Nasi uduk
Nasi ulam
Oyakodon

References

Javanese cuisine
Indonesian rice dishes
Foods containing coconut